Nordfold is a former municipality in Nordland county, Norway. The  municipality  existed from 1906 until its dissolution in 1964.  The municipality surrounded the Nordfolda branch off of the Folda fjord in what is now Steigen Municipality, plus a small portion of the present-day Sørfold Municipality.  The administrative centre of the municipality was the village of Nordfold, where the Nordfold Church is located.

History
The municipality of Nordfold was established on 1 January 1906 when the old Nordfold-Kjerringøy Municipality was split into two new municipalities: Nordfold (population: 1,485) and Kjerringøy (population: 857).  During the 1960s, there were many municipal mergers across Norway due to the work of the Schei Committee. On 1 January 1964, Nordfold municipality ceased to exist.  The eastern Mørsvikbotn district surrounding the Mørsvikfjorden in Nordfold (population: 268) was merged into the neighboring Sørfold Municipality. The rest of Nordfold (population: 1,212) was merged the following locations to create a new, much larger Steigen Municipality: the Brennsund area of Kjerringøy (population: 30), all of Leiranger Municipality (population: 1,397), a small part of Hamarøy Municipality (population: 77), and all of Steigen Municipality (population: 1,829).

Name
The municipality is named after the local Folda fjord. The first element is the prefix  which means "Northern". The inner part of the fjord is divided into two arms Nordfolda ("the northern Folda") and Sørfolda ("the southern Folda").

Government
While it existed, this municipality was responsible for primary education (through 10th grade), outpatient health services, senior citizen services, unemployment, social services, zoning, economic development, and municipal roads. During its existence, this municipality was governed by a municipal council of elected representatives, which in turn elected a mayor.

Municipal council
The municipal council  of Nordfold was made up of 17 representatives that were elected to four year terms.  The party breakdown of the final municipal council was as follows:

Mayors
The mayors of Nordfold:

 1906-1916: Peter Gylseth 
 1917–1919: Theodor I. Sivertsen  
 1920-1920: Peter Gylseth 
 1920–1922: Theodor I. Sivertsen 
 1923-1931: Agvald Vinkenes 
 1932-1942: Erling J. Vindenes
 1943–1945: Johan Aasbakk  
 1945-1951: Erling J. Vindenes
 1956–1959: Guttorm Grytøyr 
 1960–1963: Arne Arntzen

See also
List of former municipalities of Norway

References

Steigen
Sørfold
Former municipalities of Norway
1906 establishments in Norway
1964 disestablishments in Norway